Leffert may refer to:

 Leffert L. Buck (1837 - 1909), American civil engineer

See also 
 Lefferts (disambiguation)